PrestaShop is a freemium, open source e-commerce platform. 
The software is published under the Open Software License (OSL). It is written in the PHP programming language with support for the MySQL database management system. It has a software dependency on the Symfony PHP framework.

PrestaShop is currently used by  shops worldwide and is available in 60 different languages.

History 
PrestaShop started in 2005 as a student project within the EPITECH IT School in Paris, France. Originally named phpOpenStore, the software was first available in two languages: English and French. 
Three months after its launch, the project was translated into thirteen languages.

The company, PrestaShop SA, was founded in 2007 by Igor Schlumberger and Bruno Lévêque.

Between May 2010 and April 2012, PrestaShop grew from 17 employees to more than a hundred, with the establishment of secondary headquarters in Miami. As of April 2016, PrestaShop has over 120 employees and offices in 6 countries.

In March 2014, PrestaShop SA secured $9.3M in Series B Funding to continue its global expansion efforts.

In January 2015, the company launched PrestaShop Cloud, a free self-hosted version of its software, but at least since 2017 is no longer available.

The 1.7.x branch of PrestaShop is the latest branch of PrestaShop, first released as a stable version in November 2016.

Initially, maintenance for the 1.6 version was planned to expire in October 2018. For various reasons, Prestashop decided to extend this maintenance period until June 30, 2019.

PrestaShop has been built as a monolith following traditional object-oriented PHP practices. Originally based on a custom framework, it is progressively being migrated to Symfony.

In February 2018, Alexandre Eruimy took over as CEO of PrestaShop. Since then, the company has been signing large-scale strategic partnerships with companies such as Paypal, Google, Meta, TikTok and many others, in order to make the latest technological solutions available to e-retailers.

As of October 2021, 0.31% of sites employing open-source shopping cart software use PrestaShop, according to software tracking website BuiltWith.  According to W3Techs, PrestaShop is used by 0.5% of all websites.

In October 2019, PrestaShop closed the Miami headquarters and ceased its operations in the Americas.

In 2019, PrestaShop received the Acteurs du Libre International Award for its international development strategy.

The current and latest version of Prestashop is 8.0.1Migration from PrestaShop 1.7.8 to 8.0 just got easier.

In November 2021, PrestaShop joined the MBE Worldwide group to accelerate its growth and become the leading commerce platform for accelerating business growth worldwide.

Business model

As an open-source organization, PrestaShop is faced with the challenge of generating revenues.
By leveraging the size and international scope of its open-source community, the company established two main sources of revenue:
 PrestaShop Addons, a marketplace through which merchants purchase custom addons and themes for their stores
 Strategic partnerships with e-commerce industry leaders such as PayPal or Google

Features

PrestaShop has more than three hundred built-in features for managing product listing, payments, shipping, manufacturers and suppliers.
PrestaShop uses a web template system that allows users to customize store themes and add new features through add-on modules. 
The PrestaShop Addons marketplace provides a platform for third-party developers to sell themes and modules to merchants.

Themes

PrestaShop provides a basic responsive theme by default. Users can install or develop their own themes that change the display of the website without altering its content.

Modules

Add-on modules extend the software's built-in functionalities. Users may install modules directly within the software administration panel or develop their own.

SEO
The most important element for SEO optimization in PrestaShop is On-page SEO (Content, Website architecture and HTML).

Partnerships
On June 14, 2021, Wish announced a partnership with PrestaShop whereby Prestashop will provide over 300k merchants with access to the Wish marketplace.

See also

 Comparison of shopping cart software
 List of online payment service providers

References

Free e-commerce software
Free software programmed in PHP
Content management systems
Software using the Open Software License